Glanidium catharinensis is a species of driftwood catfishes found in the Tubarão River basin in Santa Catarina, Brazil in South America.

References

Ferraris, C.J. Jr., 2003. Auchenipteridae (Driftwood catfishes). p. 470-482. In R.E. Reis, S.O. Kullander and C.J. Ferraris, Jr. (eds.) Checklist of the Freshwater Fishes of South and Central America. Porto Alegre: EDIPUCRS, Brasil.. 

Auchenipteridae
Catfish of South America
Taxa named by Paulo de Miranda-Ribeiro
Fish described in 1962